Zinc finger protein 836 is a protein that in humans is encoded by the ZNF836 gene.

References

Further reading 

Human proteins